Berezeni is a commune in Vaslui County, Western Moldavia, Romania. It is composed of five villages: Berezeni, Mușata, Rânceni, Satu Nou and Stuhuleț.

References

Communes in Vaslui County
Localities in Western Moldavia
Populated places on the Prut